Bible Bloc Party is a political party in Israel.

History
The party was created by Dennis (Avi) Lipkin, a veteran religious Jewish speaker to Evangelical Christians in the US and a well-known lecturer who has spoken in over 1,000 churches. It has run for the Knesset since 2019, seeking the vote of non-Jewish Russian immigrants from the former Soviet Union and Christian Arabs, winning about 0.01% of the total vote.

Election results

References

Political parties in Israel
Christian political parties
Christianity in Israel